Pardosa is a large genus of wolf spiders, commonly known as the thin-legged wolf spiders. It was first described by C. L. Koch, in 1847, with more than 500 described species that are found in all regions of the world.

Description 
THey are small to medium size wolf spiders, with clear and median and lateral bands on the carapace. They have relatively long legs with long spines on the foot. Which can be used to quickly identify some species.

Species
 this genus contains 534 species:
 Pardosa abagensis Ovtsharenko, 1979 – Russia, Abkhazia
 Pardosa aciculifera Chen, Song & Li, 2001 – China
 Pardosa acorensis Simon, 1883 – Azores
 Pardosa adustella (Roewer, 1951) – Russia, Mongolia, China
 Pardosa aenigmatica Tongiorgi, 1966 – Italy, Turkey, Azerbaijan
 Pardosa afflicta (Holmberg, 1876) – Argentina
 Pardosa agrestis (Westring, 1861) – Palearctic
 Pardosa agricola (Thorell, 1856) – Europe to Kazakhstan
 Pardosa alacris (C. L. Koch, 1833) – Europe, Russia
 Pardosa alasaniensis Mcheidze, 1997 – Georgia
 Pardosa albatula (Roewer, 1951) – Europe
 Pardosa alboannulata Yin et al., 1997 – China
 Pardosa albomaculata Emerton, 1885 – USA, Canada, Alaska, Greenland
 Pardosa algens (Kulczynski, 1908) – Canada, Alaska, Russia
 Pardosa algina (Chamberlin, 1916) – Peru
 Pardosa algoides Schenkel, 1963 – India, Bangladesh, China
 Pardosa alii Tikader, 1977 – India
 Pardosa altamontis Chamberlin & Ivie, 1946 – US, Canada
 Pardosa alticola Alderweireldt & Jocque, 1992 – Ethiopia, Congo, Rwanda
 Pardosa altitudis Tikader & Malhotra, 1980 – India, China
 Pardosa amacuzacensis Jimenez, 1983 – Mexico
 Pardosa amamiensis (Nakatsudi, 1943) – Ryukyu Islands
 Pardosa amazonia (Thorell, 1895) – Myanmar
 Pardosa amentata (Clerck, 1757) – Europe, Russia
 Pardosa anchoroides Yu & Song, 1988 – China
 Pardosa ancorifera Schenkel, 1936 – China
 Pardosa anfibia Zapfe-Mann, 1979 – Chile
 Pardosa angolensis (Roewer, 1959) – Angola
 Pardosa angusta Denis, 1956 – Morocco
 Pardosa angustifrons Caporiacco, 1941 – Ethiopia
 Pardosa anomala Gertsch, 1933 – USA, Canada
 Pardosa apostoli Barrion & Litsinger, 1995 – Philippines
 Pardosa aquatilis Schmidt & Krause, 1995 – Cape Verde Islands
 Pardosa aquila Buchar & Thaler, 1998 – Russia, Georgia
 Pardosa arctica (Kulczynski, 1916) – Russia
 Pardosa astrigera L. Koch, 1878 – Russia, China, Korea, Taiwan, Japan
 Pardosa atlantica Emerton, 1913 – USA
 Pardosa atomaria (C. L. Koch, 1847) – Balkans, Cyprus, Rhodes, Aegean Islands
 Pardosa atrata (Thorell, 1873) – Palearctic
 Pardosa atromedia Banks, 1904 – USA
 Pardosa atronigra Song, 1995 – China
 Pardosa atropos (L. Koch, 1878) – China, Korea, Japan
 Pardosa aurantipes (Strand, 1906) – Ethiopia
 Pardosa azerifalcata Marusik, Guseinov & Koponen, 2003 – Azerbaijan
 Pardosa baehrorum Kronestedt, 1999 – Germany, Switzerland, Austria
 Pardosa balaghatensis Gajbe, 2004 – India
 Pardosa baoshanensis Wang & Qiu, 1991 – China
 Pardosa baraan Logunov & Marusik, 1995 – Russia, Mongolia
 Pardosa bargaonensis Gajbe, 2004 – India
 Pardosa basiri (Dyal, 1935) – Pakistan
 Pardosa bastarensis Gajbe, 2004 – India
 Pardosa baxianensis Wang & Song, 1993 – China
 Pardosa beijiangensis Hu & Wu, 1989 – China
 Pardosa bellona Banks, 1898 – USA, Mexico
 Pardosa benadira Caporiacco, 1940 – Ethiopia
 Pardosa bendamira Roewer, 1960 – Afghanistan
 Pardosa beringiana Dondale & Redner, 1987 – Canada, Alaska
 Pardosa bidentata Franganillo, 1936 – Cuba
 Pardosa bifasciata (C. L. Koch, 1834) – Palearctic
 Pardosa birabeni Mello-Leitao, 1938 – Argentina
 Pardosa birmanica Simon, 1884 – Pakistan to China, Philippines, Sumatra
 Pardosa blanda (C. L. Koch, 1833) – Palearctic
 Pardosa bleyi (Dahl, 1908) – Bismarck Archipel
 Pardosa brevimetatarsis (Strand, 1907) – Java
 Pardosa brevivulva Tanaka, 1975 – Russia, China, Korea, Japan
 Pardosa brunellii Caporiacco, 1940 – Ethiopia
 Pardosa buchari Ovtsharenko, 1979 – Russia, Georgia, Iran
 Pardosa bucklei Kronestedt, 1975 – USA, Canada
 Pardosa bukukun Logunov & Marusik, 1995 – Russia, Mongolia, China
 Pardosa buriatica Sternbergs, 1979 – Russia
 Pardosa californica Keyserling, 1887 – USA, Mexico
 Pardosa caliraya Barrion & Litsinger, 1995 – Philippines
 Pardosa canalis F. O. P.-Cambridge, 1902 – Mexico
 Pardosa caucasica Ovtsharenko, 1979 – Russia, Abkhazia, Azerbaijan
 Pardosa cavannae Simon, 1881 – Italy, Albania
 Pardosa cayennensis (Taczanowski, 1874) – French Guiana
 Pardosa cervina Schenkel, 1936 – China
 Pardosa cervinopilosa Schenkel, 1936 – China
 Pardosa chahraka Roewer, 1960 – Afghanistan
 Pardosa chambaensis Tikader & Malhotra, 1976 – India
 Pardosa chapini (Fox, 1935) – China
 Pardosa chenbuensis Yin et al., 1997 – China
 Pardosa chiapasiana Gertsch & Wallace, 1937 – Mexico
 Pardosa chindanda Roewer, 1960 – Afghanistan
 Pardosa cincta (Kulczynski, 1887) – Central, Eastern Europe
 Pardosa cinerascens (Roewer, 1951) – Madagascar
 Pardosa clavipalpis Purcell, 1903 – East, South Africa
 Pardosa cluens Roewer, 1959 – Cameroon
 Pardosa colchica Mcheidze, 1946 – Georgia, Armenia, Azerbaijan
 Pardosa coloradensis Banks, 1894 – USA, Canada, Alaska
 Pardosa completa (Roewer, 1959) – Mozambique
 Pardosa concinna (Thorell, 1877) – USA, Canada
 Pardosa concolorata (Roewer, 1951) – Mexico
 Pardosa condolens (O. P.-Cambridge, 1885) – Central Asia
 Pardosa confalonierii Caporiacco, 1928 – North Africa
 Pardosa confusa Kronestedt, 1988 – USA
 Pardosa consimilis Nosek, 1905 – Turkey
 Pardosa costrica Chamberlin & Ivie, 1942 – Costa Rica
 Pardosa crassipalpis Purcell, 1903 – South Africa
 Pardosa crassistyla Kronestedt, 1988 – USA
 Pardosa credula (O. P.-Cambridge, 1885) – Tajikistan
 Pardosa cribrata Simon, 1876 – Southern Europe, Algeria
 Pardosa cubana Bryant, 1940 – Cuba, Jamaica, Grand Cayman Islands
 Pardosa dabiensis Chai & Yang, 1998 – China
 Pardosa dagestana Buchar & Thaler, 1998 – Russia
 Pardosa daisetsuensis Tanaka, 2005 – Japan
 Pardosa dalkhaba Roewer, 1960 – Afghanistan
 Pardosa danica (Sørensen, 1904) – Denmark
 Pardosa darolii (Strand, 1906) – Ethiopia
 Pardosa datongensis Yin, Peng & Kim, 1997 – China
 Pardosa debolinae Majumder, 2004 – India
 Pardosa delicatula Gertsch & Wallace, 1935 – USA, Mexico
 Pardosa dentitegulum Yin et al., 1997 – China
 Pardosa desolatula Gertsch & Davis, 1940 – Mexico
 Pardosa dilecta Banks, 1898 – Mexico
 Pardosa distincta (Blackwall, 1846) – USA, Canada
 Pardosa diuturna Fox, 1937 – Canada, Alaska
 Pardosa donabila Roewer, 1955 – Iran
 Pardosa dondalei Jimenez, 1986 – Mexico
 Pardosa dorsalis Banks, 1894 – USA, Canada
 Pardosa dorsuncata Lowrie & Dondale, 1981 – USA, Canada, Alaska
 Pardosa dranensis Hogg, 1922 – Vietnam
 Pardosa drenskii Buchar, 1968 – Bulgaria
 Pardosa duplicata Saha, Biswas & Raychaudhuri, 1994 – India
 Pardosa dzheminey Marusik, 1995 – Kazakhstan
 Pardosa ecatli Jimenez, 1985 – Mexico
 Pardosa eiseni (Thorell, 1875) – Palearctic
 Pardosa ejusmodi (O. P.-Cambridge, 1872) – Syria
 Pardosa elegans (Thorell, 1875) – Russia
 Pardosa elegantula (Roewer, 1959) – Congo
 Pardosa enucleata Roewer, 1959 – South Africa
 Pardosa erupticia (Strand, 1913) – Rwanda
 Pardosa eskovi Kronestedt & Marusik, 2011 – Russia
 Pardosa evanescens Alderweireldt & Jocque, 2008 – Ivory Coast
 Pardosa evelinae Wunderlich, 1984 – Eastern Europe
 Pardosa falcata Schenkel, 1963 – Mongolia, China
 Pardosa falcifera F. O. P.-Cambridge, 1902 – USA to Costa Rica
 Pardosa falcula F. O. P.-Cambridge, 1902 – Guatemala
 Pardosa fallax Barnes, 1959 – Mexico
 Pardosa fastosa (Keyserling, 1877) – Costa Rica to Ecuador
 Pardosa femoralis Simon, 1876 – France, Spain, Russia
 Pardosa fengi Marusik, Nadolny & Omelko, 2013 – China
 Pardosa ferruginea (L. Koch, 1870) – Palearctic
 Pardosa flammula Mello-Leitao, 1945 – Argentina
 Pardosa flata Qu, Peng & Yin, 2010 – China
 Pardosa flavida (O. P.-Cambridge, 1885) – Yarkand, Turkmenistan, China
 Pardosa flavipalpis F. O. P.-Cambridge, 1902 – Mexico
 Pardosa flavipes Hu, 2001 – China
 Pardosa flavisterna Caporiacco, 1935 – Pakistan, India
 Pardosa fletcheri (Gravely, 1924) – Pakistan, India, Nepal
 Pardosa floridana (Banks, 1896) – USA, Cuba
 Pardosa fortunata (O. P.-Cambridge, 1885) – Central Asia
 Pardosa fritzeni Ballarin et al., 2012 – Kyrgyzstan
 Pardosa fulvipes (Collett, 1876) – Palearctic
 Pardosa furcifera (Thorell, 1875) – Canada, Alaska, Greenland, Iceland
 Pardosa fuscosoma Wunderlich, 1992 – Canary Islands
 Pardosa fuscula (Thorell, 1875) – USA, Canada, Alaska
 Pardosa gastropicta Roewer, 1959 – Kenya
 Pardosa gefsana Roewer, 1959 – Spain, Sicily, Sardinia, North Africa
 Pardosa gerhardti (Strand, 1922) – Sumatra
 Pardosa ghigii Caporiacco, 1932 – Morocco
 Pardosa ghourbanda Roewer, 1960 – Afghanistan
 Pardosa giebeli (Pavesi, 1873) – Europe
 Pardosa glabra Mello-Leitao, 1938 – Argentina
 Pardosa glacialis (Thorell, 1872) – Holarctic
 Pardosa golbagha Roewer, 1960 – Afghanistan
 Pardosa gopalai Patel & Reddy, 1993 – India
 Pardosa gothicana Lowrie & Dondale, 1981 – USA
 Pardosa gracilenta (Lucas, 1846) – Algeria
 Pardosa graminea Tanaka, 1985 – China, Japan
 Pardosa groenlandica (Thorell, 1872) – Russia, Alaska, Canada, USA, Greenland
 Pardosa gromovi Ballarin et al., 2012 – Kazakhstan
 Pardosa guadalajarana Dondale & Redner, 1984 – Mexico to El Salvador
 Pardosa guerechka Roewer, 1960 – Afghanistan
 Pardosa gusarensis Marusik, Guseinov & Koponen, 2003 – Azerbaijan
 Pardosa haibeiensis Yin et al., 1995 – China
 Pardosa hamifera F. O. P.-Cambridge, 1902 – Mexico, Honduras, Jamaica, Hispaniola
 Pardosa hartmanni (Roewer, 1959) – Tanzania
 Pardosa hatanensis Urita, Tang & Song, 1993 – China
 Pardosa haupti Song, 1995 – China
 Pardosa hedini Schenkel, 1936 – Russia, China, Korea, Japan
 Pardosa herbosa Jo & Paik, 1984 – Russia, China, Korea, Japan
 Pardosa hetchi Chamberlin & Ivie, 1942 – USA
 Pardosa heterophthalma (Simon, 1898) – India to Java
 Pardosa hohxilensis Song, 1995 – China
 Pardosa hokkaido Tanaka & Suwa, 1986 – Russia, Japan
 Pardosa hortensis (Thorell, 1872) – Palearctic
 Pardosa hydaspis Caporiacco, 1935 – Karakorum
 Pardosa hyperborea (Thorell, 1872) – Holarctic
 Pardosa hypocrita (Simon, 1882) – Yemen
 Pardosa ibex Buchar & Thaler, 1998 – Russia, Georgia
 Pardosa ilgunensis Nosek, 1905 – Turkey
 Pardosa incerta Nosek, 1905 – Turkey, Russia, Azerbaijan
 Pardosa indecora L. Koch, 1879 – Russia, China
 Pardosa iniqua (O. P.-Cambridge, 1876) – Egypt
 Pardosa injucunda (O. P.-Cambridge, 1876) – Africa
 Pardosa inopina (O. P.-Cambridge, 1876) – Egypt to East Africa
 Pardosa inquieta (O. P.-Cambridge, 1876) – Egypt
 Pardosa intermedia (Bösenberg, 1903) – Germany
 Pardosa invenusta (C. L. Koch, 1837) – Greece
 Pardosa irretita Simon, 1886 – Thailand, Malaysia, Borneo
 Pardosa irriensis Barrion & Litsinger, 1995 – Philippines
 Pardosa isago Tanaka, 1977 – Russia, China, Korea, Japan
 Pardosa italica Tongiorgi, 1966 – Southern Europe to China
 Pardosa izabella Chamberlin & Ivie, 1942 – Guatemala
 Pardosa jabalpurensis Gajbe & Gajbe, 1999 – India
 Pardosa jaikensis Ponomarev, 2007 – Russia, Kazakhstan
 Pardosa jambaruensis Tanaka, 1990 – China, Taiwan, Okinawa
 Pardosa jartica Urita, Tang & Song, 1993 – China
 Pardosa jaundea (Roewer, 1960) – Cameroon
 Pardosa jeniseica Eskov & Marusik, 1995 – Russia, Kazakhstan
 Pardosa jergeniensis Ponomarev, 1979 – Russia, Kazakhstan
 Pardosa jinpingensis Yin et al., 1997 – China
 Pardosa josemitensis (Strand, 1908) – USA
 Pardosa kalpiensis Gajbe, 2004 – India
 Pardosa karagonis (Strand, 1913) – Central, East Africa
 Pardosa katangana Roewer, 1959 – Congo
 Pardosa kavango Alderweireldt & Jocque, 1992 – Namibia, Botswana
 Pardosa knappi Dondale, 2007 – USA
 Pardosa kondeana Roewer, 1959 – East Africa
 Pardosa krausi (Roewer, 1959) – Tanzania
 Pardosa kronestedti Song, Zhang & Zhu, 2002 – China
 Pardosa kupupa (Tikader, 1970) – India, China
 Pardosa labradorensis (Thorell, 1875) – USA, Canada
 Pardosa laciniata Song & Haupt, 1995 – China
 Pardosa laevitarsis Tanaka & Suwa, 1986 – Japan, Okinawa
 Pardosa lagenaria Qu, Peng & Yin, 2010 – China
 Pardosa laidlawi Simon, 1901 – Malaysia
 Pardosa lapidicina Emerton, 1885 – USA, Canada
 Pardosa lapponica (Thorell, 1872) – Holarctic
 Pardosa lasciva L. Koch, 1879 – Palearctic
 Pardosa latibasa Qu, Peng & Yin, 2010 – China
 Pardosa laura Karsch, 1879 – Russia, China, Korea, Taiwan, Japan
 Pardosa lawrencei Roewer, 1959 – Tanzania
 Pardosa leipoldti Purcell, 1903 – South Africa
 Pardosa leprevosti Mello-Leitao, 1947 – Brazil
 Pardosa lignosus Ghafoor & Alvi, 2007 – Pakistan
 Pardosa lii Marusik, Nadolny & Omelko, 2013 – China
 Pardosa limata Roewer, 1959 – Namibia
 Pardosa lineata F. O. P.-Cambridge, 1902 – Mexico
 Pardosa linguata F. O. P.-Cambridge, 1902 – Mexico
 Pardosa litangensis Xu, Zhu & Kim, 2010 – China
 Pardosa littoralis Banks, 1896 – USA, Canada, Cuba
 Pardosa logunovi Kronestedt & Marusik, 2011 – Russia, Mongolia
 Pardosa lombokibia (Strand, 1915) – Lombok
 Pardosa longionycha Yin et al., 1995 – China
 Pardosa longisepta Chen & Song, 2002 – China
 Pardosa longivulva F. O. P.-Cambridge, 1902 – Mexico, Guatemala
 Pardosa lowriei Kronestedt, 1975 – USA, Canada, Alaska
 Pardosa luctinosa Simon, 1876 – Palearctic
 Pardosa ludia (Thorell, 1895) – Myanmar
 Pardosa lugubris (Walckenaer, 1802) – Palearctic
 Pardosa lurida Roewer, 1959 – Tanzania
 Pardosa lusingana Roewer, 1959 – Congo, Namibia
 Pardosa lycosina Purcell, 1903 – South Africa
 Pardosa lycosinella Lawrence, 1927 – Namibia
 Pardosa lyrata (Odenwall, 1901) – Russia, Mongolia
 Pardosa lyrifera Schenkel, 1936 – China, Korea, Japan
 Pardosa mabinii Barrion & Litsinger, 1995 – Philippines
 Pardosa mabweana Roewer, 1959 – Congo
 Pardosa mackenziana (Keyserling, 1877) – USA, Canada, Alaska
 Pardosa maculata Franganillo, 1931 – Cuba
 Pardosa maculatipes (Keyserling, 1887) – Chile
 Pardosa maimaneha Roewer, 1960 – Afghanistan
 Pardosa maisa Hippa & Mannila, 1982 – Finland, Austria, Hungary, Czech Republic, Poland, Russia
 Pardosa manicata Thorell, 1899 – Cameroon
 Pardosa manubriata Simon, 1898 – East, Southern Africa
 Pardosa marchei Simon, 1890 – Mariana Islands
 Pardosa marialuisae Dondale & Redner, 1984 – Mexico to Honduras
 Pardosa martensi Buchar, 1978 – Nepal
 Pardosa martinii (Pavesi, 1883) – Ethiopia
 Pardosa masareyi Mello-Leitao, 1939 – Ecuador
 Pardosa masurae Esyunin & Efimik, 1998 – Russia
 Pardosa mayana Dondale & Redner, 1984 – Mexico to Costa Rica
 Pardosa medialis Banks, 1898 – Mexico
 Pardosa mendicans (Simon, 1882) – Yemen
 Pardosa mercurialis Montgomery, 1904 – USA
 Pardosa messingerae (Strand, 1916) – West, Central, East Africa
 Pardosa metlakatla Emerton, 1917 – USA, Canada, Alaska
 Pardosa mikhailovi Ballarin et al., 2012 – Kazakhstan
 Pardosa milvina (Hentz, 1844) – USA, Canada
 Pardosa minuta Tikader & Malhotra, 1976 – India, Bangladesh
 Pardosa mionebulosa Yin et al., 1997 – China
 Pardosa miquanensis Yin et al., 1995 – China
 Pardosa mira Caporiacco, 1941 – Ethiopia
 Pardosa mixta (Kulczynski, 1887) – Europe, Turkey
 Pardosa modica (Blackwall, 1846) – USA, Canada
 Pardosa moesta Banks, 1892 – USA, Canada, Alaska
 Pardosa mongolica Kulczynski, 1901 – Russia, Tajikistan, Nepal, Mongolia, China
 Pardosa montgomeryi Gertsch, 1934 – USA, Mexico
 Pardosa monticola (Clerck, 1757) – Palearctic
 Pardosa mordagica Tang, Urita & Song, 1995 – China
 Pardosa morosa (L. Koch, 1870) – Europe to Central Asia
 Pardosa mtugensis (Strand, 1908) – North Africa
 Pardosa mubalea Roewer, 1959 – Congo
 Pardosa mukundi Tikader & Malhotra, 1980 – India
 Pardosa mulaiki Gertsch, 1934 – USA, Canada
 Pardosa multidontata Qu, Peng & Yin, 2010 – China
 Pardosa multivaga Simon, 1880 – China
 Pardosa muzafari Ghafoor & Alvi, 2007 – Pakistan
 Pardosa muzkolica Kononenko, 1978 – Tajikistan
 Pardosa mysorensis (Tikader & Mukerji, 1971) – India
 Pardosa naevia (L. Koch, 1875) – Egypt, Ethiopia
 Pardosa naevioides (Strand, 1916) – Namibia
 Pardosa nanica Mello-Leitao, 1941 – Argentina
 Pardosa nanyuensis Yin et al., 1995 – China
 Pardosa narymica Savelyeva, 1972 – Kazakhstan
 Pardosa nebulosa (Thorell, 1872) – Palearctic
 Pardosa nenilini Marusik, 1995 – Russia, Kazakhstan, Mongolia
 Pardosa nesiotis (Thorell, 1878) – Sumatra, Amboina
 Pardosa nigra (C. L. Koch, 1834) – Palearctic
 Pardosa nigriceps (Thorell, 1856) – Europe
 Pardosa ninigoriensis Mcheidze, 1997 – Georgia
 Pardosa nojimai Tanaka, 1998 – Japan
 Pardosa nordicolens Chamberlin & Ivie, 1947 – Canada, Alaska, Russia
 Pardosa nostrorum Alderweireldt & Jocque, 1992 – Mozambique, South Africa
 Pardosa novitatis (Strand, 1906) – Ethiopia
 Pardosa obscuripes Simon, 1909 – Morocco
 Pardosa observans (O. P.-Cambridge, 1876) – Egypt
 Pardosa occidentalis Simon, 1881 – Portugal, France, Sardinia
 Pardosa odenwalli Sternbergs, 1979 – Russia
 Pardosa oksalai Marusik, Hippa & Koponen, 1996 – Russia
 Pardosa oljunae Lobanova, 1978 – Russia
 Pardosa olympica Tongiorgi, 1966 – Greece
 Pardosa oncka Lawrence, 1927 – Africa
 Pardosa ontariensis Gertsch, 1933 – USA, Canada
 Pardosa orcchaensis Gajbe, 2004 – India
 Pardosa orealis Buchar, 1984 – Nepal
 Pardosa oreophila Simon, 1937 – Central, Southern Europe
 Pardosa oriens (Chamberlin, 1924) – China, Japan, Okinawa
 Pardosa orophila Gertsch, 1933 – USA, Mexico
 Pardosa orthodox Chamberlin, 1924 – USA, Mexico
 Pardosa ourayensis Gertsch, 1933 – USA
 Pardosa ovambica Roewer, 1959 – Namibia
 Pardosa ovtchinnikovi Ballarin et al., 2012 – Central Asia
 Pardosa pacata Fox, 1937 – Hong Kong
 Pardosa pahalanga Barrion & Litsinger, 1995 – Philippines
 Pardosa paleata Alderweireldt & Jocque, 1992 – Libya
 Pardosa paludicola (Clerck, 1757) – Palearctic
 Pardosa palustris (Linnaeus, 1758) – Holarctic
 Pardosa pantinii Ballarin et al., 2012 – Tajikistan
 Pardosa papilionaca Chen & Song, 2003 – China
 Pardosa paracolchica Zyuzin & Logunov, 2000 – Russia, Azerbaijan
 Pardosa paralapponica Schenkel, 1963 – Mongolia, China
 Pardosa paramushirensis (Nakatsudi, 1937) – Kurile Islands, Japan
 Pardosa paratesquorum Schenkel, 1963 – Russia, Mongolia, China
 Pardosa partita Simon, 1885 – India
 Pardosa parvula Banks, 1904 – USA
 Pardosa passibilis (O. P.-Cambridge, 1885) – Kyrgyzstan
 Pardosa patapatensis Barrion & Litsinger, 1995 – Philippines
 Pardosa pauxilla Montgomery, 1904 – USA
 Pardosa pedia Dondale, 2007 – Canada
 Pardosa persica Marusik, Ballarin & Omelko, 2012 – Iran
 Pardosa pertinax von Helversen, 2000 – Greece
 Pardosa petrunkevitchi Gertsch, 1934 – Mexico
 Pardosa pexa Hickman, 1944 – South Australia
 Pardosa pinangensis (Thorell, 1890) – Malaysia, Sumatra
 Pardosa pirkuliensis Zyuzin & Logunov, 2000 – Azerbaijan
 Pardosa plagula F. O. P.-Cambridge, 1902 – Mexico
 Pardosa plumipedata (Roewer, 1951) – Argentina
 Pardosa plumipes (Thorell, 1875) – Palearctic
 Pardosa podhorskii (Kulczynski, 1907) – Canada, Alaska, Russia
 Pardosa poecila (Herman, 1879) – Hungary
 Pardosa pontica (Thorell, 1875) – Eastern Europe to Central Asia
 Pardosa portoricensis Banks, 1901 – Puerto Rico, Virgin Islands, Antigua
 Pardosa potamophila Lawrence, 1927 – Namibia
 Pardosa praepes Simon, 1886 – Senegal
 Pardosa prativaga (L. Koch, 1870) – Europe, Russia
 Pardosa procurva Yu & Song, 1988 – China, Taiwan
 Pardosa profuga (Herman, 1879) – Hungary
 Pardosa prolifica F. O. P.-Cambridge, 1902 – Mexico to Panama
 Pardosa proxima (C. L. Koch, 1847) – Palearctic, Canary Islands, Azores
 Pardosa psammodes (Thorell, 1887) – Myanmar
 Pardosa pseudoannulata (Bösenberg & Strand, 1906) – Pakistan to Japan, Philippines, Java
 Pardosa pseudochapini Peng, 2011 – China
 Pardosa pseudokaragonis (Strand, 1913) – Central Africa
 Pardosa pseudolapponica Marusik, 1995 – Kazakhstan
 Pardosa pseudomixta Marusik & Fritzén, 2009 – China
 Pardosa pseudostrigillata Tongiorgi, 1966 – Austria, Italy, Slovenia
 Pardosa pseudotorrentum Miller & Buchar, 1972 – Afghanistan
 Pardosa pullata (Clerck, 1757) – Europe, Russia, Central Asia
 Pardosa pumilio Roewer, 1959 – Ethiopia
 Pardosa pusiola (Thorell, 1891) – India to China and Java
 Pardosa pyrenaica Kronestedt, 2007 – France, Andorra, Spain
 Pardosa qingzangensis Hu, 2001 – China
 Pardosa qinhaiensis Yin et al., 1995 – China
 Pardosa qionghuai Yin et al., 1995 – China
 Pardosa rabulana (Thorell, 1890) – Malaysia, Sumatra, Java
 Pardosa rainieriana Lowrie & Dondale, 1981 – USA, Canada
 Pardosa ramulosa (McCook, 1894) – USA, Mexico
 Pardosa ranjani Gajbe, 2004 – India
 Pardosa rara (Keyserling, 1891) – Brazil
 Pardosa rascheri (Dahl, 1908) – Bismarck Archipel
 Pardosa rhenockensis (Tikader, 1970) – India
 Pardosa rhombisepta Roewer, 1960 – Afghanistan
 Pardosa riparia (C. L. Koch, 1833) – Palearctic
 Pardosa riveti Berland, 1913 – Ecuador
 Pardosa roeweri Schenkel, 1963 – China
 Pardosa roscai (Roewer, 1951) – Bulgaria, Romania, Turkey
 Pardosa royi Biswas & Raychaudhuri, 2003 – Bangladesh
 Pardosa ruanda (Strand, 1913) – Rwanda
 Pardosa rudis Yin et al., 1995 – China
 Pardosa rugegensis (Strand, 1913) – Central Africa
 Pardosa sagei Gertsch & Wallace, 1937 – Panama
 Pardosa saltans Töpfer-Hofmann, 2000 – Europe, Turkey
 Pardosa saltonia Dondale & Redner, 1984 – USA, Mexico
 Pardosa saltuaria (L. Koch, 1870) – Central Europe to Kazakhstan
 Pardosa saltuarides (Strand, 1908) – Ethiopia
 Pardosa sangzhiensis Yin et al., 1995 – China
 Pardosa sanmenensis Yu & Song, 1988 – China
 Pardosa santamaria Barrion & Litsinger, 1995 – Philippines
 Pardosa saturatior Simon, 1937 – Central Europe
 Pardosa saxatilis (Hentz, 1844) – USA, Canada
 Pardosa schenkeli Lessert, 1904 – Palearctic
 Pardosa schreineri Purcell, 1903 – South Africa
 Pardosa schubotzi (Strand, 1913) – Central, East Africa
 Pardosa selengensis (Odenwall, 1901) – Russia, Mongolia
 Pardosa semicana Simon, 1885 – Sri Lanka, Malaysia, China
 Pardosa septentrionalis (Westring, 1861) – Northern Palearctic
 Pardosa serena (L. Koch, 1875) – Egypt
 Pardosa shuangjiangensis Yin et al., 1997 – China
 Pardosa shugangensis Yin, Bao & Peng, 1997 – China
 Pardosa shyamae (Tikader, 1970) – India, Bangladesh, China
 Pardosa sibiniformis Tang, Urita & Song, 1995 – China
 Pardosa sichuanensis Yu & Song, 1991 – China
 Pardosa sierra Banks, 1898 – Mexico
 Pardosa silvarum Hu, 2001 – China
 Pardosa sinensis Yin et al., 1995 – China
 Pardosa sinistra (Thorell, 1877) – USA, Canada
 Pardosa soccata Yu & Song, 1988 – China
 Pardosa socorroensis Jimenez, 1991 – Mexico
 Pardosa sodalis Holm, 1970 – Canada, Alaska, Russia
 Pardosa songosa Tikader & Malhotra, 1976 – India, Bangladesh, China
 Pardosa sordidata (Thorell, 1875) – Palearctic
 Pardosa sordidecolorata (Strand, 1906) – Ethiopia
 Pardosa sowerbyi Hogg, 1912 – China
 Pardosa sphagnicola (Dahl, 1908) – Europe, Russia
 Pardosa stellata (O. P.-Cambridge, 1885) – Central Asia
 Pardosa sternalis (Thorell, 1877) – North America
 Pardosa steva Lowrie & Gertsch, 1955 – North America
 Pardosa straeleni Roewer, 1959 – Congo
 Pardosa strandembriki Caporiacco, 1949 – Ethiopia
 Pardosa strena Yu & Song, 1988 – China
 Pardosa strigata Yu & Song, 1988 – China
 Pardosa strix (Holmberg, 1876) – Argentina
 Pardosa subalpina Schenkel, 1918 – Switzerland
 Pardosa subanchoroides Wang & Song, 1993 – China
 Pardosa subproximella (Strand, 1906) – Ethiopia
 Pardosa subsordidatula (Strand, 1915) – Israel
 Pardosa suchismitae Majumder, 2004 – India
 Pardosa sumatrana (Thorell, 1890) – India, China to Philippines, Sulawesi
 Pardosa sura Chamberlin & Ivie, 1941 – USA, Mexico
 Pardosa sutherlandi (Gravely, 1924) – India, Nepal
 Pardosa suwai Tanaka, 1985 – Russia, China, Japan
 Pardosa svatoni Marusik, Nadolny & Omelko, 2013 – Kazakhstan
 Pardosa taczanowskii (Thorell, 1875) – Russia, Mongolia, China
 Pardosa takahashii (Saito, 1936) – China, Taiwan, Japan, Okinawa
 Pardosa tangana Roewer, 1959 – Tanzania
 Pardosa tappaensis Gajbe, 2004 – India
 Pardosa tasevi Buchar, 1968 – Eastern Europe, Russia, Turkey, Azerbaijan
 Pardosa tatarica (Thorell, 1875) – Palearctic
 Pardosa tenera Thorell, 1899 – Cameroon
 Pardosa tenuipes L. Koch, 1882 – Balearic Islands
 Pardosa tesquorum (Odenwall, 1901) – Russia, Mongolia, China, USA, Canada, Alaska
 Pardosa tesquorumoides Song & Yu, 1990 – China
 Pardosa tetonensis Gertsch, 1933 – USA
 Pardosa thalassia (Thorell, 1891) – Nicobar Islands
 Pardosa thompsoni Alderweireldt & Jocque, 1992 – East Africa
 Pardosa thorelli (Collett, 1876) – Norway
 Pardosa tikaderi Arora & Monga, 1994 – India
 Pardosa timidula (Roewer, 1951) – Yemen, Sri Lanka, Pakistan
 Pardosa torrentum Simon, 1876 – Europe, Georgia
 Pardosa trailli (O. P.-Cambridge, 1873) – Britain, Scandinavia
 Pardosa tricuspidata Tullgren, 1905 – Argentina
 Pardosa tridentis Caporiacco, 1935 – India, Nepal, Kashmir
 Pardosa trifoveata (Strand, 1907) – China
 Pardosa tristicella (Roewer, 1951) – Colombia
 Pardosa tristiculella (Roewer, 1951) – Myanmar
 Pardosa trottai Ballarin et al., 2012 – Kyrgyzstan
 Pardosa tschekiangiensis Schenkel, 1963 – China
 Pardosa tumida Barnes, 1959 – Mexico
 Pardosa tuoba Chamberlin, 1919 – USA
 Pardosa turkestanica (Roewer, 1951) – Russia, Central Asia
 Pardosa tyshchenkoi Zyuzin & Marusik, 1989 – Russia
 Pardosa uiensis Esyunin, 1996 – Russia
 Pardosa uintana Gertsch, 1933 – USA, Canada, Alaska
 Pardosa umtalica Purcell, 1903 – Southern Africa
 Pardosa uncata (Thorell, 1877) – USA
 Pardosa uncifera Schenkel, 1963 – Russia, China, Korea
 Pardosa unciferodies Qu, Peng & Yin, 2010 – China
 Pardosa unguifera F. O. P.-Cambridge, 1902 – Mexico, Guatemala
 Pardosa upembensis (Roewer, 1959) – Congo
 Pardosa utahensis Chamberlin, 1919 – USA
 Pardosa vadosa Barnes, 1959 – USA, Mexico
 Pardosa vagula (Thorell, 1890) – Sumatra, Mentawai Islands, Simeulue, Java
 Pardosa valens Barnes, 1959 – USA, Mexico
 Pardosa valida Banks, 1893 – Sierra Leone, Congo
 Pardosa vancouveri Emerton, 1917 – USA, Canada
 Pardosa vatovae Caporiacco, 1940 – Ethiopia
 Pardosa verticillifer (Strand, 1906) – Ethiopia
 Pardosa vindex (O. P.-Cambridge, 1885) – Yarkand
 Pardosa vindicata (O. P.-Cambridge, 1885) – Yarkand, Karakorum
 Pardosa vinsoni (Roewer, 1951) – Madagascar
 Pardosa virgata Kulczynski, 1901 – Mongolia
 Pardosa vittata (Keyserling, 1863) – Europe to Georgia
 Pardosa vlijmi den Hollander & Dijkstra, 1974 – France
 Pardosa vogelae Kronestedt, 1993 – USA
 Pardosa v-signata Soares & Camargo, 1948 – Brazil
 Pardosa vulvitecta Schenkel, 1936 – China
 Pardosa wagleri (Hahn, 1822) – Palearctic
 Pardosa warayensis Barrion & Litsinger, 1995 – Philippines
 Pardosa wasatchensis Gertsch, 1933 – USA
 Pardosa wuyiensis Yu & Song, 1988 – China
 Pardosa wyuta Gertsch, 1934 – USA, Canada
 Pardosa xerampelina (Keyserling, 1877) – USA, Canada, Alaska
 Pardosa xerophila Vogel, 1964 – USA, Mexico
 Pardosa xinjiangensis Hu & Wu, 1989 – China
 Pardosa yadongensis Hu & Li, 1987 – China
 Pardosa yaginumai Tanaka, 1977 – Japan
 Pardosa yamanoi Tanaka & Suwa, 1986 – Japan
 Pardosa yavapa Chamberlin, 1925 – USA
 Pardosa yongduensis Kim & Chae, 2012 – Korea
 Pardosa zhangi Song & Haupt, 1995 – China
 Pardosa zhui Yu & Song, 1988 – China
 Pardosa zionis Chamberlin & Ivie, 1942 – USA, Mexico
 Pardosa zonsteini Ballarin et al., 2012 – Central Asia
 Pardosa zorimorpha (Strand, 1907) – Madagascar
 Pardosa zuojiani Song & Haupt, 1995 – China
 Pardosa zyuzini Kronestedt & Marusik, 2011 – Russia, Mongolia

Dubious names

Nomina dubia (dubious names) include:
Pardosa bernensis (Lebert, 1877)
Pardosa kratochvili (Kolosváry, 1934)
Pardosa palliclava (Strand, 1907)

References 

 
Araneomorphae genera
Cosmopolitan spiders
Taxonomy articles created by Polbot
Lycosidae genera